Ket and Wig appear in the Gesta Danorum as the sons of Frowin, the governor of Schleswig. Wig also appears in the Anglo-Saxon Chronicle as the son of Freawine (Frowin) and father of Gewis, eponymous ancestor of the kingdom of Wessex and their kings, but this is thought to be a late manipulation, inserting these heroes into a pedigree borrowed from a rival royal house, in which the Bernician eponym Bernic was replaced by the Wessex Gewis.

Their father Frowin/Freawine was challenged to combat by the Swedish king Athisl, and killed. King Wermund, who liked their father, subsequently raised Ket and Wig as his own. They later avenged their father, but they fought against Athisl two against one, a national disgrace that was redeemed by their brother-in-law, King Wermund's son Offa, when he killed two Saxons at the same time, in "single combat".  This event is referred to in Widsith as a duel against Myrgings.

References

Anglish warriors